The 1966–67 NBA Season was the 21st season of the National Basketball Association. The season ended with the Philadelphia 76ers winning the NBA Championship, beating the San Francisco Warriors 4 games to 2 in the NBA Finals, ending the Boston Celtics' record title run at 8.

Notable occurrences 
 The Chicago Bulls begin play as the NBA expands to 10 teams. 
 The Baltimore Bullets move from the West Division to the East Division.
 The NBA expands its regular season from 80 games per team to 81 games.
 The NBA expands its playoffs from 3 teams per division to 4.
 The 1967 NBA All-Star Game was played at the Cow Palace in San Francisco, California, with the West beating the East 135-120. Local hero Rick Barry won the game's MVP award.

Season recap

Philadelphia 76ers
The Philadelphia 76ers had dismissed coach Dolph Schayes of Syracuse Nationals fame. Alex Hannum, the former 50s power forward who was the last man to coach a winner past Boston, was the new coach. The 43-year-old Hannum looked like he could still play, and often ran with the club in practice.

Hannum's 76ers would share the ball, or play 'Celtic-ball' as some observed. Wilt Chamberlain would not be expected to hold the team afloat like Atlas but would pass more and get the others involved. Chamberlain had bragged in interviews that he was the sport's best passer on top of his other abilities. His eight assists per game set a record for centers and made him third in the NBA overall, scoring 24 per game, while again leading the NBA in rebounds and blocked shots.

Shooting less, he made a league-record 68% of his shots; his 875 free throw attempts, another league record, offset his dismal percentage from the foul line.

The 76ers also had three other players around the 20 point-per-game mark this year in Hal Greer with 22 points, Chet Walker and Billy Cunningham, both with 19 points. All four players combined won a league-record 68 games together under Hannum's watch. The team scored a record 125 points per game, leading all teams in shooting accuracy.

The 76ers started the season at 46–4, still the best 50 game start in league history (tied by the Golden State Warriors in the 2015–16 season). They finished the season at 68–13, the best record in league history at the time.

Celtics
The Boston Celtics won 60 games under new player/coach Bill Russell. Russell's impact on the NBA and the game as a whole had been powerful to this point. Always conscious of his racial impact as well, which included many bitter episodes in his life, Russell knew well he was now the first African American to ever coach a major American sports franchise. Some wondered if the team's whites would follow Russell, especially as America was now entering the Civil Rights Movement that included urban riots. But in the Celtics locker room, there was never any question that Russell was the leader. Being named coach was a simple formality.

The 32-year-old Russell was third in rebounds and blocks and added six assists per game to lead his club. Three twenty point scorers surrounded him --- banking Sam Jones (with 22 points), emerging John Havlicek (with 21 points), and newly acquired Bailey Howell (with 20 points). K.C. Jones again was the first line of the league's top defense, while adding five assists per game. Two other Celtics added ten points a game as well. Red Auerbach oversaw everything, now from his front office.

These two powerhouses again cast such a huge shadow over the league, that only one of the NBA's other eight teams won more than half their games.

San Francisco Warriors
The San Francisco Warriors' Rick Barry enjoyed a second terrific season as the Warriors' top scorer. He led the NBA at 35.6 per game, a mark that might have survived a typical Wilt Chamberlain season. Barry tried and made more shots than any player in the league. Barry also had the second-highest number of free throw tries, 852, and made an NBA-high 753 of them at an 88% rate. Barry also added eight rebounds and four assists per game. His meteoric rise this season saw Barry move past L.A.'s Elgin Baylor and Cincinnati's Jerry Lucas as the best forward in the game.

The other Warrior star emerging was center Nate Thurmond. A former protégé of Chamberlain, Thurmond ranked second in the NBA in rebounds and blocks while adding 19 points per game.

Five other Warriors scored ten points per game or better under coach and former Celtic Bill Sharman.

Playoffs
The NBA was now at ten teams, thanks to the addition of the Chicago Bulls. With two-five team divisions now, the NBA had four playoff teams from both the East and West, with just two NBA teams missing the post-season tournament. Chicago surpassed the Detroit Pistons for the last spot in the West, putting America's second-largest city in the playoffs, which continued to become a larger television event each year.

In the East, the two dominators both won their first round series with just one lost game each. Philadelphia beat Cincinnati and superstar Oscar Robertson three games to one. Boston beat an improving New York Knickerbockers club led by third-year star Willis Reed three to one also. The 
Boston–Philadelphia matchup was set again for the division final.

In the West, San Francisco and second-place St.Louis both advanced behind 3–0 sweeps. The Warriors routed the Lakers, minus superstar Jerry West, while the St.Louis Hawks ended the first season of Chicago's Bulls, led by coach Johnny Kerr, the former Syracuse Nationals star, and players Bob Boozer, Don Kojis and Guy Rodgers.

Rich Guerin's balanced Hawks, led by Lenny Wilkens, Lou Hudson and Bill Bridges, tried hard to slow Barry, Thurmond and Co., but the Warriors made their second NBA Finals in four seasons, four games to two.

Those expecting a close series in the East or another Philadelphia fold were stunned to see a five-game series completely dominated by the 76ers. Winning the first three in clear numbers, the Sixers brought Boston back to their home court so they could bash the Celtics 140-116 and send them home. Bill Russell's first season as coach was a disappointment only in comparison to Auerbach's towering achievements before him. Chamberlain turned down the victory champagne from that celebrated win, saying there was still one more series to win.

The Warriors were not all that cooperative, taking Game One to overtime and winning two games. Barry and Thurmond's performances were impressive. But Philadelphia's three 20-point scorers – Chamberlain, Walker and Greer – led their franchise to their first NBA title since the old Syracuse days in 1955, the first season of the 24-second clock.

Wilt averaged 22 points, 29 rebounds, nine assists and 58% shooting for his 15 playoff games. He also had many blocks and had 160 free throw tries to offset his misses there. Wilt, again, likely posted multiple quadruple-double games this year, including perhaps in the Finals. However, blocked shots were not then kept as a league statistic (and would not be until 1973), so it is impossible to determine.

Final standings

Eastern Division

Western Division

x – clinched playoff spot

Playoff bracket

Statistics leaders

Note: Prior to the 1969–70 season, league leaders in points, rebounds, and assists were determined by totals rather than averages.

NBA awards
Most Valuable Player: Wilt Chamberlain, Philadelphia 76ers
Rookie of the Year: Dave Bing, Detroit Pistons
Coach of the Year: Johnny Kerr, Chicago Bulls

All-NBA First Team:
G – Oscar Robertson, Cincinnati Royals
G – Jerry West, Los Angeles Lakers
C – Wilt Chamberlain, Philadelphia 76ers
F – Elgin Baylor, Los Angeles Lakers
F – Rick Barry, San Francisco Warriors

All-NBA Second Team:
G – Hal Greer, Philadelphia 76ers
G – Sam Jones, Boston Celtics
C – Bill Russell, Boston Celtics
F – Jerry Lucas, Cincinnati Royals
F – Willis Reed, New York Knicks

NBA All-Rookie First Team:
Jack Marin, Baltimore Bullets
Dave Bing, Detroit Pistons
Erwin Mueller, Chicago Bulls
Lou Hudson, St. Louis Hawks
Cazzie Russell, New York Knicks

See also
1967 NBA Finals
1966–67 NBA season

References 
1966–67 NBA Season Summary, basketball-reference.com. Retrieved March 31, 2010.